Miklós Szilágyi de Alsó-Baksán et Nagy-Dobán (was born at the end of the 14th century), was a Hungarian nobleman, member of the House of Szilágyi, grandfather of Erzsébet Szilágyi and Michael Szilágyi, maternal great-grandfather of King Matthias of Hungary

Family
He had 5 children:
Ladislaus (Bernolt László) Szilágyi
Mihály I Szilágyi
László Szilágyi
Orsolya Szilágyi
Zsófia Szilágyi

Sources
Fraknói Vilmos: Michael Szilágyi, The uncle of King Matthias (Bp., 1913)
W.Vityi Zoltán: King Matthias maternal relatives
Felsőmagyarországi Minerva: nemzeti folyó-irás, Volumul 6

References 

Miklos
Hungarian nobility